"Naughty Girl" is a song performed by Australian recording artist Holly Valance for her debut album Footprints (2002). The song was released as the album's third and final single on 9 December 2002. It was written by Grant Black, Cozi Costi, Deborah Ffrench and Brio Taliaferro and produced by Phil Thornalley.

"Naughty Girl" debuted at number three on the Australian Singles Chart in the issue dated 20 January 2003, being the highest debut on the singles chart for that week. It became the third consecutive single from Footprints to reach the top 10 in Australia. The single eventually spent 11 weeks in the top 50 and 18 weeks in the top 100, leaving the chart in the issue dated 26 May 2003. It became the 16th-highest-selling single in Australia for 2003 and was awarded a gold certification on its third week on the chart for shipments in excess of 35,000 copies.

Track listings

Australian and UK CD1
 "Naughty Girl" – 3:26
 "Naughty Girl" (Ernie Lake Hustle mix) – 5:42
 "Naughty Girl" (E&B vocal dub) – 5:40
 "Naughty Girl" (Bare Brush mix) – 4:57

Australian and UK CD2
 "Naughty Girl" – 3:26
 "Naughty Girl" (K-Klass radio edit) – 3:44
 "Twist" –  3:45
 "Naughty Girl" (video)

UK cassette single
 "Naughty Girl" – 3:26
 "Naughty Girl" (K-Klass radio edit) – 3:44

European CD single
 "Naughty Girl" – 3:23
 "Naughty Girl" (Crash full length vocal mix) – 7:25

Credits and personnel
Credits are adapted from the liner notes of Footprints.

 Holly Valance – lead vocals
 Phil Thornalley – production, guitars
 Anders Kallmark – additional production, programming, keyboards
 Pete Craigie – mixing
 Helen Boulding – background vocals
 Cozi Costi – songwriting, additional vocals
 Martyn Phillips – programming, keyboards
 Marc Fox – percussion
 Grant Black – songwriting
 Deborah Ffrench – songwriting
 Brio Taliaferro – songwriting

Charts

Weekly charts

Year-end charts

Certifications

Release history

References

2002 songs
2003 singles
Holly Valance songs
London Records singles
Music videos directed by Jake Nava